Calling Out Loud is an album by jazz cornetist Nat Adderley released on the CTI label featuring performances by Adderley with Jerome Richardson, Joe Zawinul, Ron Carter, and Leo Morris and with brass and woodwinds arranged and conducted by Bill Fischer.

Reception
The Allmusic review by Richard S. Ginell awarded the album 4½ stars calling it "A fascinating album, beautifully produced".

Track listing
All compositions by Nat Adderley except where noted
 "Biafra" - 6:32
 "Haifa" - 4:57
 "St. M" (William S. Fischer) - 3:37
 "Grey Moss" (Joe Zawinul) - 3:43
 "Nobody Knows" (Fischer) - 5:53
 "Comin' Out the Shadows" - 5:09
 "Ivan's Holiday" (Zawinul) - 3:14
 "Calling Out Loud" (Adderley, Fischer) - 3:21
Recorded at Englewood Cliffs, New Jersey on November 19, 1968 (tracks 7 & 8), November 21, 1968 (tracks 1 & 5) and December 4, 1968 (tracks 2-4 & 6)

Personnel
Nat Adderley – cornet
Paul Ingraham - French horn
Seldon Powell, Jerome Richardson, Jerry Dodgion, Richard Henderson - saxophones
Hubert Laws - flute, piccolo
Don MacCourt - bassoon
George Marge - clarinet, English horn, saxophone
Romeo Penque - bass clarinet
Joe Zawinul  - electric piano
Ron Carter - bass
Leo Morris - drums
Bill Fischer - arranger, conductor
Technical
Pete Turner - photography

References

1968 albums
CTI Records albums
Nat Adderley albums
Albums produced by Creed Taylor
Albums recorded at Van Gelder Studio